Ted Berry (born June 4, 1972, Richmond, Virginia) is a professional basketball player. The guard attended Christopher Newport University in Virginia.

In 1997, Berry moved to the UK to play for Derby Storm in the British Basketball League (BBL). He was acquired by new franchise the Edinburgh Rocks in 1998 where his virtuoso style made him a firm favourite with the fans. His six seasons in the UK gave him EU residency and even made him eligible to represent Scotland at international level. However, Berry moved on to French team Rueil in 2003, where he led the side to the promotion play-off final. He currently plays for Spanish club Provincia de Palencia after stint in France's Pro A and B.

In 2007, he founded the Tri-City Summer League in his hometown of Richmond, bringing the best local players together for a series of free off-season games. It replaced the previous league in which Berry was a regular participant.

Career history
2008–2009  Gijón Baloncesto (LEB Plata)
2007–2008  Palencia Baloncesto (LEB Plata) 
2006–2007  Bàsquet Inca (LEB)
2005  Orléans Loiret Basket
2005  Charleville
2004  SLUC Nancy
2004  Brest
2003  Rueil
1998–2003  Edinburgh/Scottish Rocks (BBL)
1997–1998  Derby Storm (BBL)
1996–1997  Fargo Beez (International Basketball Association)
1995  Asheville Smokies (American Major Basketball League)
1994–1995  Horsham Hornets
1994  Long Island Surf (USBL)

Honours
BBL All-star: 1997–98, 1998–99, 1999–00, 2000–01, 2001–02
BBL MVP: 1998–99
BBL Playoff winner: 2002–2003

Trivia
Berry's former team Scottish Rocks retired his number 5 jersey in honour of his service to the club.

References

See also
Scottish Rocks

1972 births
Living people
American expatriate basketball people in France
American expatriate basketball people in Spain
American expatriate basketball people in the United Kingdom
Basketball players from Richmond, Virginia
Christopher Newport Captains men's basketball players
Glasgow Rocks players
Guards (basketball)
Gijón Baloncesto players
SLUC Nancy Basket players
Palencia Baloncesto players
CB Inca players
American men's basketball players
American expatriate sportspeople in Scotland
Naturalised citizens of the United Kingdom
American expatriate sportspeople in England
Naturalised sports competitors
American expatriate basketball people in Australia
British men's basketball players